Kasba Tadla (Berber: ⴰⵢⵜ ⵎⵍⵍⴰⵍ) is a town in Béni-Mellal Province, Béni Mellal-Khénifra, Morocco. According to the 2004 census it has a population of 200
,898.

History 

Tadla is an Amazigh name means bouquet of wheat.
The city was taken by the Ifrenids in the early eleventh century. The city fell to the Almoravids thereafter to 1068.

Monuments

References

External links

Populated places in Béni Mellal Province
Municipalities of Morocco
Kasbahs in Morocco